Aleksei Vasilyevich Tyurgashkin (born 20 July 1981) is a former Russian professional football player.

Club career
He played in the Russian Football National League for FC Torpedo Vladimir in the 2011–12 season.

References

External links
 

1981 births
Sportspeople from Ivanovo
Living people
Russian footballers
Association football midfielders
FC Tekstilshchik Ivanovo players
FC Spartak Kostroma players
FC Torpedo Vladimir players